Boston Glacier is located in a large cirque below several mountain peaks in North Cascades National Park in the U.S. state of Washington. Extending in an arc from the north of Forbidden Peak, it is flanked by Boston Peak to the southwest and Buckner Mountain at its eastern margin, between which it lies below the arête known as Ripsaw Ridge. Another arête extending between Boston Peak, Sharkfin Tower, Forbidden Peak and further north separate Boston Glacier from the nearly adjoining Quien Sabe and Forbidden Glaciers. Boston Glacier has been in an overall state of retreat since the end of the Little Ice Age around the year 1850. A moderate advance occurred between 1950 and the mid-1970s; however, the retreat resumed and between 1972 and 2006 its terminus retreated .

See also
List of glaciers in the United States

References

Glaciers of the North Cascades
Glaciers of Skagit County, Washington
Glaciers of Washington (state)
North Cascades National Park